Olesya Rostovskaya (born 6 January 1975) is a Russian composer, theremin player, carillonneur, organist, and Russian zvon bell-ringer.

Biography

Olesya Rostovskaya studied piano at Anna Artobolevskaya class in Central Music School of Tchaikovsky Moscow State Conservatory. 

Then from 1993 to 2000 she completes her study at Tchaikovsky Moscow State Conservatory as composer (Professor - the head of Conservatory composition department - Albert Leman) and in 2001 she also graduates Moscow Conservatory as organist (Professor - Oleg Yanchenko). 

In 1998 she began to study playing thereminvox with Lydia Kavina. From 2003 Olesya Rostovskaya became a Russian bell-ringer. In 2006 she began to play carillon. In 2008 she has graduated the Saint-Petersburg State University as carillonneur (Professor  - Jo Haazen) and in 2009 she has also graduated the Royal Carillon School "Jef Denyn" in Mechelen, Belgium (Professor - Jo Haazen).
      
Olesya Rostovskaya has huge activity as a composer with her compositions for symphony and chamber orchestras, different ensembles, choir, organ, carillon, thereminvox, vocal, music for theater, radio, electro acoustic music. Among her compositions there are “Markus – Passion”, Concert for thereminvox and orchestra, “Carriage” opera on the book of Nikolay Gogol and many other.
     
Her music was played in: 
Moscow conservatory, Tchaikovsky Moscow Philharmony Hall, Moscow International House of Music, Glinka State Central Museum of Musical Culture, Roman Catholic Cathedral of Immaculate Conception of the Blessed Virgin Mary, Moscow Composers Union House, National Center of Contemporary Arts (Moscow), “Luzhniki” Palace of Sports (Moscow), Mariinsky Theatre Concert Hall, Pro Arte Institute (St. Petersburg foundation for promotion of contemporary culture), “The Peter and Paul Fortress” (The State Museum of the History of St. Petersburg), and many other famous stages in Russia, Ukraine, Estonia, Belgium, Great Britain, Germany, France, Nederland and other.

      
She is an artist member of “Duo inventum” ensemble and “Ars mirabilis” ensemble.
        
She has an experience of playing with orchestras conducted by: Vladimir Fedoseev, Vladimir Ponkin, Veronika Dudarova, Sergey Skripka, Svetlana Bezrodnaya, Edvard Serov, and Vladislav Bulakhov. Also choirs: Blagovest (conducted by Galina Koltsova), and Choir of The State Tretyakov Gallery (conducted by Alexey Pusakov).

She has played with the ensembles Studio for New Music (Centre for Contemporary Music in Moscow Conservatory conducted by Igor Dronov), Pan-Asian ensemble, and many other musicians.

           
Olesya Rostovskaya is a solo performer on organ, carillon and thereminvox. She is an active performer with authentic, classical and contemporary repertoire, improvisations and her own music also too. She performed original concert programs, for ex.: “Discotheque of 16th century”, “The secret life of church organists”, “The famous pedal solos”, “What did Peter I the Great hear from carillon tower”, “Soul of the Bell; Russian Music on Carillon”, “Playing on Waves”. She also pays great attention to improvisations on thereminvox and carillon, often includes them to her concerts.
          
She makes many educational works. The booklet What is the Carillon? was published in Russian in 2009 as well as CD Soul of the Bell; Russian Music on Carillon.  In 2008 she wrote the book Playing skill of bell music: parallels of Russian & Flemish traditions. Many seminars and workshops were made for thereminvox (“Thereminvox: the practical magic” and others). An article “How to compose music for thereminvox” was published. Olesya Rostovskaya is an author of two cycles of radio programs: Secrets of Musician and Don Carillon.

Works

For orchestra
 Suite for symphonic orchestra
 Concert for thereminvox & orchestra
 Suite for thereminvox & string orchestra
 “To make the word “ETERNITY” - camber symphony for orchestra of soloists on the theme DSCH.

For choir
 “Marcus Passion” for soloists, choir and chamber ensemble
 Ave Maria for choir and organ
 Ave Maria for choir and piano
 “Hoi Ivan!” for choir and solo-violin
 “Lullaby” for children choir and piano

Ensembles
 Mass for soprano, alto and organ
 Quintet for two violins, viola, cello and piano
 Suite for violin and piano
 Suite for guitar and piano
 “Crystal Meditation” for percussion
 Suite for viola and harp
 “Suonare” for cello and organ
 “Isolde” for thereminvox and lute (as part of whole composition “Tristan and Isolde” with Sandor Kalloś)
 “Chloe” for thereminvox, lute and soundtrack (as part of whole composition “Daphnis and Chloe” with Sandor Kalloś)
 “Basso ostinato” for two lutes
 Suite for flute and lute
 Suite for two theremins
 Cycle of pieces for four theremins
 Concert for organ and harpsichord
 Concert for three organs, wind and a bird
 Ave Maria for soprano, cello and piano
 “Beautiful songs” for soprano and chamber ensemble
 Adagio and Foxtrot for eight cellos and piano
 “Скаккато” - children piano music for four hands
 "Shine" for organ and bells

For solo instruments
 Concert for oboe
 Cycle of pieces for viola
 “Six ancient Greek duets” for lute
 4 inventions for thereminvox solo

For carillon solo
 “Swiss music-box”
 Elegies d moll, G dur, Es dur, F dur, с moll
 “Romantic suite”
 “St. Peter & St.Paul belfry in St.Petersburg”
 The Second carillon suite (“Old-Dance-Suite”)
 The Third carillon suite
 “Changing twinkles”
 Cycle "Звоны русской традиции"
 "Swinging bells"

Carillon for four hands
 The First carillon suite
 Two Japanese tanka
 Notturno
 “Echo of rain”
 Duet с moll
 Two inventions – G dur and A dur

For piano solo
 “Dithyramb B-La-F” for composer Belaev
 Piece for pianist B. Petrushansky
 “Little bird” - cycle of pieces for children

For organ solo 
 Triosonata
 “Twelve non-existent chorals”
 «Освальд фон Волкенштайн – заходит в зáмок – и выходит, раненный в сердце»
 Chorals
 Fantasia “Hieronymus Bosch”
 "Suite of ancient dances”
 J.P.Sweelinck - O.Rostovskaya "Fantasia "Echo"

For thereminvox
 “Suonare” for thereminvox and organ
 Cryptophonian piece on name "Roslavets" (theremin & piano)
 "Romance" (theremin & piano)
 "Luminescence" for theremin & ANS synthesizer
 "Africanian Suite"
 Cycle pieces in retro-style
 “Murmures” for theremin and glass armonica

Electronic music
 “Music of Breath”
 “Духовный стих”
 “Methods of upbringing”
 “Way to berth”
 “Corpuscular mechanics”
 "North voices" (with live djembe)
 "Nightingale" (with live djembe)
 "Monkey-Donkey beat-box" (with live djembe)
 "Ascension" for ANS synthesizer and organ

with solo - theremin
 “Russian bell”
 “X-plot”
 “Charmed wood”
 “Paranoidalian Eros of Kadakes” for theremin with live electronic (programming by Dmitry Subochev)
 “Swan” for theremin with live electronic (programming by Dmitry Subochev)

Discography
 Soul of a Bell. Russian Music on Carillon (Audio CD) —  AM 090000, © Artes Mirabiles, 2009  
The first in the world Audio CD with just only Russian music played on carillon. Recorded in 2007 on carillon of the Peter and Paul Fortress at St.Petersburg.
Recording and editing engineer - Vladimir Ryabenko, mastering engineer – Alexey Pogarskiy.
 Nikolai Obouhov. Croix Sonore (Audio CD) -  SMC CD 0083, © & (P) Moscow State Tchaikovsky Conservatoire, 2012
 What Peter The Great Heard From The Carillon Tower (Audio CD + DSD 256) —  AM 160001, © Artes Mirabiles, 2016
 Soul of a Bell 2 (Audio CD + DSD 256) —  AM 170002, © Artes Mirabiles, 2017
 Tanido Espanol (Audio CD + DSD 256) —  AM 170003, © Artes Mirabiles, 2017
 16 Century Discothèque (Audio CD + DSD 256) —  AM 170004, © Artes Mirabiles, 2017
 The Bells of Northern Skies (Audio CD + DSD 256) —  AM 180005, © Artes Mirabiles, 2018
 The Organ In A Russian Home (Audio CD + DSD 256) —  AM 180007, © Artes Mirabiles, 2018
 Weightlessness - theremin and electric violin (Audio CD + DSD 512) —  AM 190008, © Artes Mirabiles, 2019
 5 Parts from 'Missa Electronica Paschalis' for theremin, voices, organ and electronics (DSD 512) —  AM 200010, © Artes Mirabiles, 2020

Awards
Sacred music contest (1996, Russia)
First National Young Composers Contest (1999, Russia)
“New generation music” festival (2000, Russia)
Massalitinov's national music contest (2005, Russia)
Piano improvisation contest (2006, Russia)
10th ARTIADA of Russia (2009, Russia)
«Pure Sound 2019» International Award for the Best Audio Recording of Russian Academic Music (2019, Russia) 
       
Olesya Rostovskaya is a member of Russian Composers Union. She is also a member of Russian Association of Electro-acoustical music and Association of Russian Organists.

References

External links

 Page of Olesya Rostovskaya on YouTube
 Olesya Rostovskaya on Bandcamp
 Works by Olesya Rostovskaya at NativeDSD 
 Olesya Rostovskaya at Theremin Today
 Olesya Rostovskaya at workshop for MOTUS VITA in Riga
 Olesya Rostovskaya has got award as theremin performer at «Pure Sound 2019» nomination Chamber Vocal Music

1975 births
Living people
21st-century classical composers
21st-century women composers
Carillonneurs
Composers for carillon
Composers for theremin
Women classical composers
Historicist composers
Musicians from Moscow
Musicians from Saint Petersburg
Postminimalist composers
Royal Carillon School "Jef Denyn" alumni
Russian classical composers
Russian women classical composers
Theremin players
Women in electronic music